On the Job Training is a 2008 independent feature film, written and directed by Geff Zamor.  It premiered and won the audience award at the 2007 Fort Lauderdale International Film Festival and will be screening at the 2008 Hollywood Black Film Festival.

Plot
It's June and Chauncey Nelson [Deance Wyatt] has just graduated from high school. Where most kids his age will spend their summer getting ready for college, Chauncey's got other plans: kick it with his boy Diego, win a youth boxing tournament and buy an Impala. Of course we all know what happens to even the best laid plans; Chauncey and Diego hang and get hung up in small-time hustles that go sour and the boxing tournament KOs any chance of Chauncey sporting golden gloves. Just as his dream car is about to ride off into the sunset, Chauncey gets it, there's a big difference between having a dream and working hard to make a dream come true.

Cast
 Deance Wyatt as Chauncey
 Ronnie Alvarez as Diego 
 Tracy Moore as Mario
 Lewis Powell	as Tracy
 Rey Lucas as Oscar
 Rod Rinks as Sal
 Nicole Fitzgerald as Tiffany
 Laila Odom as Michelle.
 Ahnaise Christmas as Denise
 Jerry Milord as Eddie
 Kim Adams as marketing exec.

References

External links

 Consortium Films: Production Company website
 Official MySpace Page

American independent films
2008 comedy-drama films
American comedy-drama films
2008 films
2000s English-language films
2000s American films